Baghjeghaz, also rendered as Baghjehqaz or Baghchehqaz or Baghjehghaz may refer to:
 Baghjeghaz-e Olya
 Baghjeghaz-e Sofla